Pokrovsk (Pokrovskay) is a town and the administrative center of Khangalassky District of the Sakha Republic, Russia, located on the left bank of the Lena River,  southwest of Yakutsk, the capital of the republic. As of the 2010 Census, its population was 9,495.

History
It was first founded by the Cossacks in 1682 as the ostrog of Karaulny Mys, meaning "watchtower point". It later became the selo of Pokrovskoye. It was granted urban-type settlement status and renamed Pokrovsk in 1941; town status was granted to it in 1998.

Administrative and municipal status
Within the framework of administrative divisions, Pokrovsk serves as the administrative center of Khangalassky District. As an inhabited locality, Pokrovsk is classified as a town under republic jurisdiction. As an administrative division, it is incorporated within Khangalassky District as the Town of Pokrovsk. As a municipal division, the Town of Pokrovsk is incorporated within Khangalassky Municipal District as Pokrovsk Urban Settlement.

Transport
The Lena Highway connecting Yakutsk with the destinations further south is on the opposite bank of the Lena River, passing through the selo of Kerdyom.

References

Notes

Sources
Official website of the Sakha Republic. Registry of the Administrative-Territorial Divisions of the Sakha Republic. Khangalassky District. 

Cities and towns in the Sakha Republic
Populated places on the Lena River